Darryll Paul Holland (born 14 June 1972 in Manchester, England) is a United Kingdom flat racing jockey who has ridden for trainers such as Luca Cumani, Geoff Wragg, and Mark Johnston.

In 1991 he was the British Champion Apprentice and won the Lester Award for Apprentice Jockey of the Year.  He has also received two further Lester awards for ride of the year on Just James & Double Trigger.
He finished third in his first Epsom Derby in 1993, on the 150/1 shot Blues Traveller.  He went on to finish second in the 2006 Epsom Derby on 66/1 Dragon Dancer beaten a short head by Sir Percy.

Major wins
 Great Britain
 Coronation Cup – (1) – Warrsan (2004)
 Dewhurst Stakes – (1) – Milk It Mick (2003)
 Eclipse Stakes – (2) – Compton Admiral (1999), Falbrav (2003)
 Fillies' Mile – (1) – Simply Perfect (2006)
 International Stakes – (1) – Falbrav (2003)
 July Cup – (1) – Continent (2002)
 King's Stand Stakes – (1) – The Tatling (2004)
 Queen Elizabeth II Stakes – (1) –  Falbrav (2003)
 St. James's Palace Stakes – (1) – Zafeen (2003)
 Sun Chariot Stakes – (2) – Danceabout (2000), Majestic Roi (2007)
 Yorkshire Oaks – (1) – My Emma (1997)

 France
 Prix de l'Abbaye de Longchamp – (1) – Continent (2002)

 Germany
 Preis der Diana – (1) – Almerita (2006)
 Rheinland-Pokal – (1) – Luso (1998)

 Ireland
 Pretty Polly Stakes – (1) – Chorist (2004)

 Italy
 Gran Criterium – (1) – Pearl of Love (2003)
 Oaks d'Italia – (1) – Menhoubah (2004)
 Premio Parioli – (1) – Dupont (2002)
 Premio Regina Elena – (1) – Love of Dubai (2008)

 Singapore
 Singapore Derby – (1) All The Way (2000)
 Kranji Mile – (1) Pacific Prince (2000)

References
 Darryll Holland's website

1972 births
Living people
English jockeys
Lester Award winners
British Champion apprentice jockeys